Bay Harbor Islands is a town in Miami-Dade County, Florida, United States. The population was 5,922 at the 2020 census. It is separated from the mainland by Biscayne Bay.

History
Bay Harbor Islands was founded by Shepard Broad on April 28, 1947.

Geography
Bay Harbor Islands is located at  (25.887522, –80.135739).  It sits near the north end of Biscayne Bay and consists of two islands, originally known as Broadview and Bay Harbor, now referred to as, respectively, the West and East Islands. The West Island features single family homes, while the East Island contains the business district, the Ruth K. Broad Bay Harbor K–8 Center, and multi-family housing. To the west, across Biscayne Bay, is the city of North Miami, connected via the Shepard Broad Causeway. To the east, across Indian Creek, lie the village of Bal Harbour and the town of Surfside. To the south across Indian Creek Lake, with no direct road access from Bay Harbor Islands, lies the village of Indian Creek.

Surrounding areas
  Biscayne Bay
 Biscayne Bay    Bal Harbour
 Biscayne Bay   Bal Harbour
 Biscayne Bay    Surfside
  Indian Creek, Surfside

East Island architecture
At one time, Bay Harbor Islands East Island featured one of the largest concentrated collections of mid-century Miami Modern architecture. Now, one will find many of these buildings intermixed with contemporary residences and boutique waterfront condominiums.

Demographics

2020 census

As of the 2020 United States census, there were 5,922 people, 2,418 households, and 1,542 families residing in the town.

2010 census

As of 2010, there were 3,199 households, out of which 18.8% were vacant. In 2000, 20.3% had children under the age of 18 living with them, 35.6% were married couples living together, 10.7% had a female householder with no husband present, and 50.4% were non-families. 43.1% of all households were made up of individuals, and 18.6% had someone living alone who was 65 years of age or older.  The average household size was 1.97 and the average family size was 2.71.

2000 census
In 2000, the Town's population was spread out, with 18.0% under the age of 18, 5.0% from 18 to 24, 32.1% from 25 to 44, 21.7% from 45 to 64, and 23.3% who were 65 years of age or older.  The median age was 42 years. For every 100 females, there were 80.1 males.  For every 100 females age 18 and over, there were 75.3 males.

In 2000, the median income for a household in the Town was $38,514, and the median income for a family was $43,939. Males had a median income of $38,750 versus $31,044 for females. The per capita income for the Town was $29,261.  About 8.0% of families and 13.1% of the population were below the poverty line, including 20.7% of those under age 18 and 6.8% of those age 65 or over.

As of 2000, speakers of English as a first language constituted 52.05% of the population, while Spanish accounted for 43.90%, Portuguese 1.65%, Hebrew 1.30%, and French 1.10%.

Education
Ruth K. Broad Bay Harbor K–8 Center in Bay Harbor Islands serves as the local elementary and K–8 school. Residents who want to have a conventional middle school may instead choose the zoned middle school, Miami Beach Nautilus Middle School. Miami Beach Senior High School is the senior high school serving this area.

Notable people

 Christian Fittipaldi (born 1971), race car driver
 George Kenney (1889–1977). United States Army general during World War II who commanded Allied Air Forces in the Southwest Pacific Area from August 1942 and 1945.
 Nito Mestre (born 1952), songwriter
 Louis Slobodkin (1903–1975), sculptor, writer and illustrator of numerous children's books
 Sebastian Spreng (born 1956), visual artist and music journalist
 Walter Stone (1920–1999), screenwriter best known for his work as the head writer for The Honeymooners
 Néstor Torres (born 1957), jazz flautist
 Lesley Visser (born 1953), sportscaster who was the first female NFL analyst on TV
 Garrett Wittels (born 1990), baseball player

In popular culture
In the TV series Dexter the title character Dexter Morgan's apartment is in Miami, but a real condo in Bay Harbor Islands was used for the exterior shooting location. In the second season of Dexter, the discovery of Dexter's victims' remains inspires the press to dub the serial killer the "Bay Harbor Butcher".

Parts of the video for the song "La Tortura" by Colombian recording artist, Shakira, featuring Spanish recording artist Alejandro Sanz, was recorded at the historic Coral Sea Towers building in Bay Harbor Islands.

References

External links

 

Bay Harbor Islands, Florida
Towns in Miami-Dade County, Florida
Islands of Miami-Dade County, Florida
Towns in Florida
Populated places on the Intracoastal Waterway in Florida